The Atlas of Transnistria, also known as the Atlas of the Dniester Moldavian Republic or the Atlas of Pridnestrovie is to date the most thoroughly researched reference work in existence for Transnistria, a region which declared independence from Moldova in 1990.

Under the leadership of Mikhail Burla the Atlas was produced over a two-year period by the T.G. Shevchenko University in Tiraspol, Transnistria. It contains 57 highly detailed maps with data and statistics on a wide range of subjects related to Transnistria.

External links 
 Internet version of the atlas (only opens with Internet Explorer)
PDF version of the atlas

Politics of Transnistria